Hadi Moghadamdoost (born 1971) is an Iranian director and screenwriter. He is best known for his screenplay for the 2018 film Sholevar, for which he received several industry nominations. He has directed several movies:
 2020 - Soldier (TV series)
2016 - Never
 2013 - The Sealed Secret
 2011 - The Meeting 
 2011 - Adhesive Plaster

References

Iranian directors
1971 births
Living people
Iranian screenwriters